The Orne is a river in Normandy, within northwestern France. It discharges into the English Channel at the port of Ouistreham. Its source is in Aunou-sur-Orne, east of Sées. Its main tributaries are the Odon and the Rouvre.

The Orne flows through the following departments and towns:

Orne (named after the river): Sées, Argentan 
Calvados: Thury-Harcourt, Caen, Ouistreham

Name
The name of the Orne in Normandy, which is referred to as the Olinas by Ptolemy, is a homonym of Fluvius Olne, the Orne saosnoise in Sarthe, which Xavier Delamarre traces back to the Celtic olīnā (elbow).

Hydrology and water quality
The waters of the Orne are typically moderately turbid and brown in colour.  pH levels of the Orne have been measured at 8.5 at the town of St. Andre sur Orne where summer water temperatures approximate 18 degrees Celsius. Electrical conductivity of the Orne has been measured at 30 micro-Siemens per centimeter.

See also
 St. Andre sur Orne
 Canal de Caen à la Mer
 Operation Tonga

References

External link

Rivers of Normandy
Rivers of France
Rivers of Calvados (department)
Rivers of Orne
0Orne